Da Tang Fu Rong Yuan is a Chinese television series based on a novel by Nangong Bo (南宫博) about the romance between Emperor Xuanzong of the Tang dynasty and his consort Yang Yuhuan. The series was directed by Zhou Xiaowen and starred Fan Bingbing and Winston Chao. It was first broadcast on CCTV-8 in mainland China in 2007.

Plot
This story is set during the Tang Dynasty, during the late reign of Emperor Xuanzong of Tang. A young girl named Yang Yuhuan fell in love with Peng Bo with the help of her best friend, Xie A'man. Due to unfortunate circumstances, Yang Yuhuan is chosen as the wife of Li Mao, the Prince of Shou. Even after her marriage, she communicated with Peng Bo through Xie A'man. The Prince of Shou is a kind and gentle man, and Yang Yuhuan eventually develops feelings for him.

The Prince of Shou's mother Consort Wu soon succumbs to illness. His father, Emperor Xuanzong is greatly saddened since Consort Wu Huifei was his favorite consort.
Emperor Xuanzong's servant, Gao Lishi soon seeks to find a replacement for Consort Wu. At a banquet, Emperor Xuanzong notices the beauty of his daughter-in-law, Yang Yuhuan. He falls in love with her, and sensing this, Gao Lishi soon offers Yang Yuhuan as a consort to Emperor Xuanzong.

Yang Yuhuan is angered, because she actually loves the Prince of Shou. She is forced to leave him, and she watches the Prince of Shou willingly comply with Gao Lishi's orders. To reward the Prince of Shou with his behavior, Emperor Xuanzong awards him a new wife. She also reunites with Peng Bo and Xie A'man, and tells them about her hardships. Xie A'Man becomes her dancer, and they gain the favor of Emperor Xuanzong. She is soon promoted to the title of Guifei.

Tragedy would again struck, due to the corruption of Yang Guozhong, Gao Lishi, and other officials. Yang Guozhong was Yang Guifei's cousin and succeeded Li Linfu as chancellor. Li Linfu was a capable official, and after he was removed, chaos enveloped the government. This leads to the rebellion of An Lushan, and the imperial family loses their dignity. An Lushan's forces soon take over the Imperial Palace, and Emperor Xuanzong is left wandering with Yang Guifei. The situation soon escalates, and Gao Lishi persuades Emperor Xuanzong to leave Yang Guifei. Yang Guifei performs one last dance for Emperor Xuanzong, and hangs herself.

Cast
 Fan Bingbing as Yang Yuhuan
 Winston Chao as Emperor Xuanzong of Tang
 Ma Lun as Gao Lishi
 Wei Wei as Xie A'man
 Ji Ning as Li Mao
 Zhang Zhihong as Li Linfu
 Zhang Tong as Yang Guozhong
 Zhang Jingdong as Li Heng
 Zang Jinsheng as An Lushan
 Liu Lei as Consort Wu
 Yue Yue as Yang Yi
 Li Xiumeng as Peng Bo
 Gao Yalin as Li Fuguo
 Yu Fei as Gao Shang
 Xu Dongsheng as Li Ying
 Zeng Qiusheng as Zhang Jiuling
 Wang Yuzhang as Yang Xuanji
 Li Xiaofeng as Ji Wen
 Zhao Bo as Wu Wenchen
 Zhang Tielin (guest star) as Li Bai
 Xie Jintian as Princess Yuzhen
 Wan Meixi as Princess Xianyi
 Cui Jian as Yang Hui
 Ren Mingsong as Consort Wei
 Liu Hui as Wei Laixin
 Zhao Yong as Wei Jian
 Zhao Yaodong as Li Shizhi
 Zhao Zhongwei as Huangfu Weiming
 Wang Anqing as Lu Buchu
 Guo Wenxue as Wang Zhongsi
 Zhang Yu as Chunshun

External links
 
  Da Tang Fu Rong Yuan on Sina.com

2007 Chinese television series debuts
Television series set in the Tang dynasty
Mandarin-language television shows
Chinese historical television series
Chinese romance television series
China Central Television original programming
Television series set in the 8th century